Tom Gann (born January 11, 1959) is an American politician who has served in the Oklahoma House of Representatives from the 8th district since 2016.

References

1959 births
Living people
Republican Party members of the Oklahoma House of Representatives
21st-century American politicians